Karl Hähnel (11 October 1892 – 14 May 1955) was a German racewalker. He competed in the men's 50 kilometres walk at the 1932 Summer Olympics. He placed fourth (4th) with a time of 5:06:06, losing to Ugo Frigerio (3rd), Jānis Daliņš (2nd), and Tommy Green (athlete) (1st)

References

1892 births
1955 deaths
Athletes (track and field) at the 1932 Summer Olympics
German male racewalkers
Olympic athletes of Germany
Place of birth missing